Dennis Morrison is a retired professional American football player who played quarterback for the San Francisco 49ers.  A left handed quarterback, he played college football at Kansas State.

References

American football quarterbacks
1951 births
Living people
San Francisco 49ers players
Kansas State Wildcats football players
People from Pico Rivera, California